Saanich was a provincial electoral district in the Canadian province of British Columbia.  It made its first appearance in the election of 1903 and its last in the general election of 1963 after which it was combined with parts of the former Nanaimo and the Islands riding to form Saanich and the Islands.  The same area is currently represented by Saanich North and the Islands and Saanich South.

For other current and historical electoral districts in the area of Victoria, British Columbia please see Victoria (electoral districts).

Electoral history
Note: Winners in each election are in bold.

|-

|Liberal
|Henry Ernest Tanner
|align="right"|260
|align="right"|54.62%
|align="right"|
|align="right"|unknown
|- bgcolor="white"
!align="right" colspan=3|Total valid votes
!align="right"|476
!align="right"|100.00%
!align="right"|
|- bgcolor="white"
!align="right" colspan=3|Total rejected ballots
!align="right"|
!align="right"|
!align="right"|
|- bgcolor="white"
!align="right" colspan=3|Turnout
!align="right"|%
!align="right"|
!align="right"|
|}

|-

|Liberal
|John Piercy
|align="right"|257 	 	
|align="right"|48.31%
|align="right"|
|align="right"|unknown
|- bgcolor="white"
!align="right" colspan=3|Total valid votes
!align="right"|532
!align="right"|100.00%
!align="right"|
|- bgcolor="white"
!align="right" colspan=3|Total rejected ballots
!align="right"|
!align="right"|
!align="right"|
|- bgcolor="white"
!align="right" colspan=3|Turnout
!align="right"|%
!align="right"|
!align="right"|
|}

|-

|Liberal
|Thomas Brydon
|align="right"|303 	 	
|align="right"|42.38%
|align="right"|
|align="right"|unknown

|- bgcolor="white"
!align="right" colspan=3|Total valid votes
!align="right"|715
!align="right"|100.00%
!align="right"|
|- bgcolor="white"
!align="right" colspan=3|Total rejected ballots
!align="right"|
!align="right"|
!align="right"|
|- bgcolor="white"
!align="right" colspan=3|Turnout
!align="right"|%
!align="right"|
!align="right"|
|}

|-

|Liberal
|William Noble
|align="right"|176 		
|align="right"|30.99%
|align="right"|
|align="right"|unknown
|- bgcolor="white"
!align="right" colspan=3|Total valid votes
!align="right"|568 
!align="right"|100.00%
!align="right"|
|- bgcolor="white"
!align="right" colspan=3|Total rejected ballots
!align="right"|
!align="right"|
!align="right"|
|- bgcolor="white"
!align="right" colspan=3|Turnout
!align="right"|%
!align="right"|
!align="right"|
|}

|-

|Liberal
|Frederick Arthur Pauline
|align="right"|1,033
|align="right"|58.53%
|align="right"|
|align="right"|unknown
|- bgcolor="white"
!align="right" colspan=3|Total valid votes
!align="right"|1,765
!align="right"|100.00%
!align="right"|
|- bgcolor="white"
!align="right" colspan=3|Total rejected ballots
!align="right"|
!align="right"|
!align="right"|
|- bgcolor="white"
!align="right" colspan=3|Turnout
!align="right"|%
!align="right"|
!align="right"|
|}

|-

|Liberal
|Frederick Arthur Pauline
|align="right"|912 		
|align="right"|30.19%
|align="right"|
|align="right"|unknown
|- bgcolor="white"
!align="right" colspan=3|Total valid votes
!align="right"|3,021
!align="right"|100.00%
!align="right"|
|- bgcolor="white"
!align="right" colspan=3|Total rejected ballots
!align="right"|
!align="right"|
!align="right"|
|- bgcolor="white"
!align="right" colspan=3|
!align="right"|%
!align="right"|
!align="right"|
|} 	  	 

|-

|Liberal
|Norman William Whittaker
|align="right"|1,836 	 		
|align="right"|43.56%
|align="right"|
|align="right"|unknown
|- bgcolor="white"
!align="right" colspan=3|Total valid votes
!align="right"|4,215 
!align="right"|100.00%
!align="right"|
|- bgcolor="white"
!align="right" colspan=3|Total rejected ballots
!align="right"|72
!align="right"|
!align="right"|
|- bgcolor="white"
!align="right" colspan=3|
!align="right"|%
!align="right"|
!align="right"|
|}

|Co-operative Commonwealth Fed.
|William Edouard Peirce
|align="right"|1,216 		 	
|align="right"|21.27%
|align="right"|
|align="right"|unknown

|Liberal
|Norman William Whittaker
|align="right"|2,171
|align="right"|37.97%
|align="right"|
|align="right"|unknown
|- bgcolor="white"
!align="right" colspan=3|Total valid votes
!align="right"|5,718
!align="right"|100.00%
!align="right"|
|- bgcolor="white"
!align="right" colspan=3|Total rejected ballots
!align="right"|47
!align="right"|
!align="right"|
|- bgcolor="white"
!align="right" colspan=3|
!align="right"|%
!align="right"|
!align="right"|
|}

|Independent
|Frank Bertram Shearme
|align="right"|37 				 	
|align="right"|0.63%

|Co-operative Commonwealth Fed.
|Thomas Guy Sheppard
|align="right"|1,531 		 	
|align="right"|26.27%

|Liberal
|Norman William Whittaker
|align="right"|2,106
|align="right"|36.14%
|- bgcolor="white"
!align="right" colspan=3|Total valid votes
!align="right"|5,828 
!align="right"|100.00%
!align="right"|
|- bgcolor="white"
!align="right" colspan=3|Total rejected ballots
!align="right"|88

|-

|Co-operative Commonwealth Fed.
|Martin Anton Neilson
|align="right"|2,385 	 		 	
|align="right"|28.59%
|align="right"|
|align="right"|unknown

|Liberal
|Norman William Whittaker
|align="right"|3,017
|align="right"|36.17%
|align="right"|
|align="right"|unknown
|- bgcolor="white"
!align="right" colspan=3|Total valid votes
!align="right"|8,341 
!align="right"|100.00%
!align="right"|
|- bgcolor="white"
!align="right" colspan=3|Total rejected ballots
!align="right"|158
!align="right"|
!align="right"|
|- bgcolor="white"
!align="right" colspan=3|
!align="right"|%
!align="right"|
!align="right"|
|}

|-

|Conservative
|Loudon Hope McQueen 1
|align="right"|275 	 	 	
|align="right"|2.94%
|align="right"|
|align="right"|unknown

|Co-operative Commonwealth Fed.
|Martin Anton Neilson
|align="right"|3,431 		 		 	
|align="right"|36.66%
|align="right"|
|align="right"|unknown

|- bgcolor="white"
!align="right" colspan=3|Total valid votes
!align="right"|9,359
!align="right"|100.00%
!align="right"|
|- bgcolor="white"
!align="right" colspan=3|Total rejected ballots
!align="right"|138
!align="right"|
!align="right"|
|- bgcolor="white"
!align="right" colspan=3|
!align="right"|%
!align="right"|
!align="right"|
|- bgcolor="white"
!align="right" colspan=7|1  McQueen was listed as a Progressive Conservative Party candidate in the Statement of Votes and List of Candidates, but he is more properly classified as an Independent PC since the Progressive Conservative Party, formerly the Conservative Party, was officially running as part of the Coalition and did not consider MacQueen as a legitimate party candidate. (cited from Elections BC, Note 4)
|}

|-

|Co-operative Commonwealth Fed.
|Martin Anton Neilson
|align="right"|4,646 	 		 	
|align="right"|30.73%
|align="right"|
|align="right"|unknown
|- bgcolor="white"
!align="right" colspan=3|Total valid votes
!align="right"|15,117 	
!align="right"|100.00%
!align="right"|
|- bgcolor="white"
!align="right" colspan=3|Total rejected ballots
!align="right"|407
!align="right"|
!align="right"|
|- bgcolor="white"
!align="right" colspan=3|
!align="right"|%
!align="right"|
!align="right"|
|}

|-

|Liberal
|Arthur James Richard Ash
|align="right"|4,964        			 	 		
|align="right"|28.89%
|align="right"|7,599
|align="right"|49.13
|align="right"|
|align="right"|unknown

|Progressive Conservative
|Cecil James Hamilton Holms
|align="right"|3,407         	 	 	 	
|align="right"|19.83%
|align="right"| - 
|align="right"| - %
|align="right"|
|align="right"|unknown

|Co-operative Commonwealth Fed.
|Frank Snowsell
|align="right"|5,863
|align="right"|34.12%
|align="right"|7,867
|align="right"|50.87%
|align="right"|
|align="right"|unknown
|- bgcolor="white"
!align="right" colspan=3|Total valid votes
!align="right"|17,181   
!align="right"|100.00%
|align="right"|15,466	
|align="right"|
!align="right"|
|- bgcolor="white"
!align="right" colspan=3|Total rejected ballots
!align="right"|657
!align="right"|
!align="right"|
|align="right"|
|align="right"|
|- bgcolor="white"
!align="right" colspan=3|
!align="right"|%
!align="right"|
!align="right"|
|align="right"|
|align="right"|
|- bgcolor="white"
!align="right" colspan=7|2  Preferential ballot.  First and final of three counts only shown.
|}

|-

|Liberal
|Arthur James Richard Ash
|align="right"|4,256 	        			 	 		
|align="right"|25.09%
|align="right"| - 
|align="right"| -.- %
|align="right"|
|align="right"|unknown

|Progressive Conservative
|Nora Grace Lindsay
|align="right"|990 	          	 	 	 	
|align="right"|5.84%
|align="right"| - 
|align="right"| - %
|align="right"|
|align="right"|unknown

|Co-operative Commonwealth Fed.
|Frank Snowsell
|align="right"|5,037 	     	 		 	
|align="right"|29.69 	 	 
|align="right"|6,466
|align="right"|42.15%
|align="right"|
|align="right"|unknown

|- bgcolor="white"
!align="right" colspan=3|Total valid votes
!align="right"|16,964 	  	 	    
!align="right"|100.00%
|align="right"|15,342	
|align="right"|
!align="right"|
|- bgcolor="white"
!align="right" colspan=3|Total rejected ballots
!align="right"|605
!align="right"|
!align="right"|
|align="right"|
|align="right"|
|- bgcolor="white"
!align="right" colspan=3|
!align="right"|%
!align="right"|
!align="right"|
|align="right"|
|align="right"|
|- bgcolor="white"
!align="right" colspan=7|3  Preferential ballot.  First and final of three counts only shown.
|}

|-

|Progressive Conservative
|Hugh Larratt Henderson
|align="right"|
|align="right"|unknown

|Liberal
|Hugh Dyer Ramsay
|align="right"|3,344 	 	        			 	 		
|align="right"|20.17%
|align="right"|
|align="right"|unknown

|Co-operative Commonwealth Fed.
|Frank Snowsell
|align="right"|5,439 		     	 		 	
|align="right"|32.80 	 	 
|align="right"|
|align="right"|unknown

|- bgcolor="white"
!align="right" colspan=3|Total valid votes
!align="right"|16,582 	  	 	    
!align="right"|100.00%
|align="right"|
|- bgcolor="white"
!align="right" colspan=3|Total rejected ballots
!align="right"|181
|align="right"|
|align="right"|
|- bgcolor="white"
!align="right" colspan=3|
!align="right"|%
|align="right"|
|align="right"|
|}

|-

|Liberal
|Frank W. Grieve
|align="right"|4,451 	 	 	        			 	 		
|align="right"|19.37%
|align="right"|
|align="right"|unknown

|Co-operative Commonwealth Fed.
|Thomas Patrick Holman
|align="right"|6,512 		     	 		 	
|align="right"|28.33%	 	 
|align="right"|
|align="right"|unknown

|Progressive Conservative
|Victor Ernest Virgin
|align="right"|1,782 	
|align="right"|7.75
|align="right"|
|align="right"|unknown
|- bgcolor="white"
!align="right" colspan=3|Total valid votes
!align="right"|22,983  	 	    
!align="right"|100.00%
|align="right"|
|align="right"|
|- bgcolor="white"
!align="right" colspan=3|Total rejected ballots
!align="right"|313
|align="right"|
|align="right"|
|align="right"|
|- bgcolor="white"
!align="right" colspan=3|
!align="right"|%
|align="right"|
|align="right"|
|align="right"|
|}

|-

|Progressive Conservative
|Gordon Lee
|align="right"|3,180 	 	
|align="right"|14.63%
|align="right"|
|align="right"|unknown

|Liberal
|Ian Hugh Stewart
|align="right"|3,049 		 	 	        			 	 		
|align="right"|14.03%
|align="right"|
|align="right"|unknown

|New Democrat
|John Windsor
|align="right"|4,778 			     	 		 	
|align="right"|21.98%	 	 
|align="right"|
|align="right"|unknown
|- bgcolor="white"
!align="right" colspan=3|Total valid votes
!align="right"|21,739 	  	 	    
!align="right"|100.00%
|align="right"|
|align="right"|
|- bgcolor="white"
!align="right" colspan=3|Total rejected ballots
!align="right"|158
|align="right"|
|align="right"|
|align="right"|
|- bgcolor="white"
!align="right" colspan=3|
!align="right"|%
|align="right"|
|align="right"|
|align="right"|
|}

The Saanich riding was combined with parts of Nanaimo and the Islands to form Saanich and the Islands for the 1966 election.

Sources 

Elections BC historical returns

Former provincial electoral districts of British Columbia